The SECAT S-5 was a light, high-wing, two-seat touring monoplane aircraft, designed and built by the Société d'Etudes et de Construction d'Avions de Tourisme in France shortly after the end of World War II. Only one example of the type was ever built, and it flew for a variety of private owners for several decades.

Development
Société d'Etudes et de Construction d'Avions de Tourisme (SECAT) had been established in the late 1930s, and in 1938 had built the two-seat, high-wing S-4 Mouette, the development of which was interrupted by the hostilities.

Design

Design work on light aircraft was resumed by SECAT in 1946, resulting in the SECAT S-5, the prototype of which was first flown in that year. The S-5 was based on the design of the S-4, and was of all-wooden construction and had side-by-side seating for two persons. The cantilever, elliptical high-set wing comprised a wooden box-spar, chordwise ribs and a stressed plywood skin. The trailing edge carried ailerons and flaps. The fuselage was a wooden semi-monocoque and dual controls were fitted. The windscreen was split. A large access door was provided on each side of the fuselage, and all fuel was carried in a  tank installed in the wing. After the prototype, no further examples of the type were completed.

Operational history
The sole example of the SECAT S-5, registered F-PIIC, was initially operated from Toussus-le-Noble Airport, near Paris. By 1964, it was owned by M. Rene Dupuis, and it was hangared at Arras Roclincourt Airport. The aircraft was still extant in 1967; however, it was struck off the French civil aircraft register during the 1970s.

Specifications

See also

References

1940s French civil utility aircraft
S-5
High-wing aircraft
Single-engined tractor aircraft
Aircraft first flown in 1946